The Great American Steak Religion was a Canadian independent record label which released many notable hardcore records from the likes of Shotmaker, His Hero Is Gone, and Chokehold during the 1990s. Originally based in Ottawa at 5 Arlington Avenue, founder Yannick Lorrain moved to Quebec City, and then to Montreal, taking the label with him. In 2004, the last release under this label was issued: Union Of Uranus' discography titled To This Bearer Of Truth. Many of the releases were issued only on vinyl and were etched with the word "Verse" and then a number, hence the tagging of each release as such.

Releases
Verse 1
Uranus/Immoral Squad Split 7"  1994

Verse 2
Reach Out - Wall Street 7"

Verse 3
Shotmaker - Crayon Club LP

Verse 4
Drift - Self-titled 7"

Verse 5
Union of Uranus - Disaster By Design 2x7"

Verse 6
Franklin - Roy Is Dead 7"

Verse 7
One Eyed God Prophecy - Toddler LP

Verse 8
Chokehold - Content with Dying LP

Verse 9
?

Verse 10
Four Hundred Years - Suture LP

Verse 11
Young Pioneers - Crime Wave EP 10"

Verse 12
Hacksaw - Kick It 7"

Verse 13
His Hero Is Gone/Union Of Uranus - Split EP 12"

Verse 14
His Hero Is Gone - Fools Gold 7"

Verse 15
His Hero Is Gone - The Plot Sickenss: Enslavement Redefined

Verse 16
Mine - Tetanus CD
or
From Ashes Rise - Concrete and Steel LP

Verse 17
From Ashes Rise - Silence LP

Verse 18
Meanwhile - The Show Must Go On 7"

Verse 19
Born Dead Icons - The Modern Plague 7"

Verse 20
Union Of Uranus - To The Bearer Of Truth CD

See also 
 List of record labels

References

Record labels established in 1994
Record labels disestablished in 2004
Canadian independent record labels
Hardcore record labels
Defunct record labels of Canada